The discography of Australian rock musician Rick Springfield consists of 22 studio albums, 12 compilation albums, five live albums, 34 singles and 11 music videos. In 1995, Springfield formed a side-project, Sahara Snow, with Tim Pierce on guitar and Bob Marlette on keyboards and percussion, which released a self-titled studio album in 1997. In 2021, he formed a similar side project with the Red Locusts.

Studio albums

With Sahara Snow

With The Red Locusts

Compilation albums

Live albums

Singles

Other appearances

Notes
A  Wait for Night was originally released on Chelsea Records in 1976. It was re-released by RCA Records in 1982 and peaked on the Billboard 200 in 1983.
B  Beautiful Feelings was originally recorded in 1978 but was not issued at that time. Mercury Records re-recorded the instrumentation and released it in late 1984 without Springfield's approval. It peaked on the Billboard 200 in 1985. In 1980, "Bruce" had been released by Springfield as a non-album single; it became the lead track of the album and was re-issued by Mercury Records by December 1984. The original 1978 recordings were released by Springfield in 2007 as The Early Sound City Sessions.
C  Greatest Hits was released by Evergreen Records in 1988 as a CD with ten tracks. RCA Records issued a twelve-track compilation of the same name in 1989 as a CD and LP.

References

External links

 
 
Discographies of American artists
Pop music discographies
Rock music discographies